DJ-Kicks: Henrik Schwarz is a DJ mix album mixed by German producer Henrik Schwarz. It was released on the !K7 independent record label as part of the DJ-Kicks series.

Track listing
 "Intro" – Henrik Schwarz – 0:44
 "Bird's Lament" – Moondog – 2:38
 "Woman of the World" – Double – 3:09
 "Claire" – iiO – 3:15
 "Spanish Joint" – D'Angelo – 4:11
 "Since You've Been Gone" – James Brown – 2:18
 "Jon (Live Version)" – Henrik Schwarz – 4:47
 "Let It Out" – Jae Mason – 2:31
 "Anthracite" – Cymande – 3:17
 "Imagination Limitation (DJ-KiCKS)" – Henrik Schwarz – 6:12
 "Black Sea" – Drexciya – 3:43
 "Giya Kasiamore" – Amampondo – 2:15
 "Walk a Mile in My Shoes (Henrik Schwarz Remix)" – Coldcut ft. Robert Owens – 7:50
 "The Core" – Robert Hood – 0:31
 "Chant Avec Cithare" – artist unknown – 1:12
 "Summun Bukmun Umyun" – Pharoah Sanders – 3:30
 "You Can Be a Star" – Luther Davis Group – 4:30
 "Get Around to It" – Arthur Russell – 4:05
 "Conscious of My Conscience" – Womack & Womack – 5:16
 "Let Jah Love Come" – Rhythm & Sound, Sugar Minott – 3:37
 "Wake Up Brothers" – Doug Hammond – 3:07
 "You're the Man (Alternate Version 2)" – Marvin Gaye – 3:55
 "Outro" – Henrik Schwarz – 1:12

Audio links
 RBMA Radio on Demand – Train Wreck Mix – Henrik Schwarz (Sunday-Music, Berlin)

References

External links
 DJ-Kicks official website
 

Schwarz, Henrik
2006 compilation albums